Streptogyna is a widespread genus of tropical plants in the grass family. It is the only genus in the monotypic tribe Streptogyneae.

 Species
 Streptogyna americana C.E.Hubb. - Mexico (Chiapas, Veracruz), Central America, tropical South America (Venezuela, Colombia, Peru, Ecuador, Bolivia, Brazil, Guyana, Fr Guiana, Suriname), Trinidad
 Streptogyna crinita P.Beauv.

References

Oryzoideae
Grasses of North America
Grasses of South America
Flora of Central America
Grasses of Mexico
Flora of Chiapas
Flora of Veracruz
Flora of the Amazon
Neotropical realm flora
Poaceae genera
Taxa named by Palisot de Beauvois